Daddala lucilla is a species of moth in the family Erebidae. The species is found in the Himalaya, Taiwan, Japan, Burma, Thailand, Sumatra, Borneo, Java, Bali and Sulawesi.

The wingspan is 48–54 mm.

External links
The Moths of Borneo
Japanese Moths

Sypnini
Moths of Asia
Moths of Japan